The 2001 San Jose State Spartans football team represented San Jose State University in the 2001 NCAA Division I-A football season. Under first-year head coach Fitz Hill, the Spartans finished the season 3–9.

Personnel

Schedule

 A.  The game against Nevada was originally to be played on September 22 but was re-scheduled.
 B.  The game against Stanford was originally to be played on September 15 but was re-scheduled because of the September 11 attacks.

Game Summaries

at USC

at Colorado

at Arizona State

at Louisiana Tech

SMU

at UTEP

Tulsa

at Hawaii

Nevada

at Boise State

at No. 23 Fresno State

No. 12 Stanford

References

San Jose State
San Jose State Spartans football seasons
San Jose State Spartans football